Daulatpur is a census town in Pathankot district in the state of Punjab, India.

Geography
It has an average elevation of 315 metres (1036 feet).

Demographics
 India census, Daulatpur had a population of 4544. Males constitute 53% of the population and females 47%. Daulatpur has an average literacy rate of 74%, higher than the national average of 59.5%: male literacy is 78% and, female literacy is 70%. In Daulatpur, 10% of the population is under 6 years of age.

References

Cities and towns in Pathankot district